Abe Bekker (born 10 June 1935) is a Zambian former boxer who competed in the flyweight class at the 1954 British Empire and Commonwealth Games in Vancouver and in the bantamweight class at the 1958 British Empire and Commonwealth Games in Cardiff representing Northern Rhodesia. He also represented Rhodesia at the 1960 Summer Olympics in the featherweight division, where he was eliminated in the quarterfinals by Jorma Limmonen of Finland.

References

1935 births
Living people
People from Mufulira
Flyweight boxers
Bantamweight boxers
Featherweight boxers
Zambian male boxers
Boxers at the 1954 British Empire and Commonwealth Games
Boxers at the 1958 British Empire and Commonwealth Games
Commonwealth Games silver medallists for Northern Rhodesia
Commonwealth Games medallists in boxing
Boxers at the 1960 Summer Olympics
Olympic boxers of Rhodesia
Afrikaner people
White Zambian people
Medallists at the 1954 British Empire and Commonwealth Games